Reticulation is a net-like pattern, arrangement, or structure.

Reticulation or Reticulated may refer to:

 Reticulation (single-access key), a structure of an identification tree, where there are several possible routes to a correct identification
 A coloration pattern of some animals (e.g. the reticulated giraffe)
 An arrangement of veins in a leaf, with the veins interconnected like a network
 The endoplasmic reticulum within a cell, often resembling a net
 A phylogenetic network, the result when hybrid speciation, introgression and parapyletic speciation is applied to a phylogenetic tree
 Reticulated water (Australia, South Africa), water from a piped network rather than from a bore or well, see: wiktionary:reticulated water
Reticulation (metalwork), a decorative technique in metalworking

See also 
 Reticular (disambiguation)